Montserrado-3 is an electoral district for the elections to the House of Representatives of Liberia. The constituency covers the Morris Farm, Wood Camp, Pipe Line A, Pipe Line B and Neezoe communities of Paynesville.

Elected representatives

References

Electoral districts in Liberia